Dry Creek (formerly called Linda Creek) is a  long stream in Placer County, California, tributary to the Sacramento River via Steelhead Creek. Its watershed lies within the Sacramento Valley. Because suburban development borders much of its length, the stream is noted for its capacity to cause local flooding and as a recreational attraction.

Route

Placer County
The Dry Creek watershed headwaters are in western Placer County, in the foothills of Sierra Nevada. A number of smaller streams meet in Roseville, and the combined stream is called Dry Creek starting from the confluence of Antelope Creek and Miners Ravine. Dry Creek flows first southwest through Royer Park in downtown Roseville. Then it meets Cirby Creek and continues west across a Union Pacific railyard, past a City of Roseville wastewater treatment plant, into unincorporated Placer County, and then southwest again toward Sacramento.

Sacramento County
After crossing into Sacramento County, Dry Creek flows south-southwest between Gibson Ranch County Park (to the west) and the city of Antelope (to the east). Then it flows southwest through the community of Rio Linda, mostly split into two parallel branches that enclose a long narrow strip of land called Cherry Island. Finally, Dry Creek enters the City of Sacramento northwest of Robla, flows west-southwest (forming a small delta) and merges with Steelhead Creek (Natomas East Main Drainage Canal). Steelhead Creek flows south into Discovery Park in American River Parkway and then west (parallel with American River) into Sacramento River.

Tributaries
Dry Creek tributaries include:

 Antelope Creek
 Clover Valley Creek
 Miners Ravine
Secret Ravine
 Boardman Canal
Sucker Ravine
 False Ravine
Whites Ravine
 Cirby Creek
 Linda Creek
 Strap Ravine
 Swan Stream
 Goat Creek (aka. Sierra Creek)

Environmental conditions in the Roseville area
Historically Dry Creek and its tributaries have supported anadromous fish.
In the Dry Creek watershed four insecticides (DDT, aldrin, heptachlor, and dieldrin, were used extensively for soil insect control between 1945 and 1965; certain residues of these chemical persist in upper soils of some of the upper Dry Creek watershed. In addition there have been instances of subsurface fuel releases.

See also
 Anadromous

References

Rivers of Placer County, California
Rivers of Sacramento County, California
Roseville, California
Rivers of Northern California